Pangus scaritides is a species of beetle in the family Carabidae, the only species in the genus Pangus.

References

Harpalinae